Balavoulin, also known as Milton Lodge, is a Category B listed building in Blair Atholl, Perth and Kinross, Scotland.

The building is two storeys with an attic, and its architect was Ramsay Traquair.

James Syme Drew, a major-general in the British Army, was living at Balavoulin at the time of his death in 1955.

References

Category B listed buildings in Perth and Kinross
Listed buildings in Blair Atholl
1905 establishments in Scotland